Graingers is an unincorporated community and census-designated place (CDP) in Lenoir County, North Carolina, United States. It was first listed as a CDP in the 2020 census with a population of 229.

The community is in northeastern Lenoir County, along North Carolina Highway 11. North Carolina Highway 148, the C.F. Harvey Parkway, has its eastern terminus at NC-11 in the northeastern end of Graingers.

Demographics

2020 census

Note: the US Census treats Hispanic/Latino as an ethnic category. This table excludes Latinos from the racial categories and assigns them to a separate category. Hispanics/Latinos can be of any race.

References 

Census-designated places in Lenoir County, North Carolina
Census-designated places in North Carolina